Cleon Scotland (date of birth unknown) is a former Bermudian cricketer. Scotland's batting style is unknown.

Scotland made two List A appearances for Bermuda, against Jamaica in the 1997–98 Red Stripe Bowl and Guyana in the 1998–99 Red Stripe Bowl, He batted twice, but was dismissed for ducks in both innings.

Outside of cricket Scotland worked as a travel agent, as well as writing children's books. His father Rupert Scotland played first-class cricket for Bermuda.

References

External links
Cleon Scotland at ESPNcricinfo
Cleon Scotland at CricketArchive

Living people
Bermudian cricketers
Bermudian writers
Bermudian people of Antigua and Barbuda descent
British sportspeople of Antigua and Barbuda descent
Year of birth missing (living people)
Travel agents (people)